The qualification for the 2013 FIBA Americas Championship in Venezuela was held as early as 2011 until 2012. There are several stages of qualification for some teams.

Qualification format
Each FIBA Americas subzone has a specific number of berths, generally based on the relative strengths of its member national teams. For the 2013 FIBA Americas Championship, the berths distribution is:

North America
For the North American zone, since there are only 2 member teams (Canada and the United States), and there are 2 berths, this means there no more qualification games to be held. Furthermore, the United States won the 2012 Olympic gold medal and was thus automatically qualified for the 2014 FIBA Basketball World Cup, thus allowing Canada to earn an automatic qualification. This means they do not have to participate, resulting in their non-participation. This opens up an extra berth, which was awarded to the fourth placed team in the South American Basketball Championship 2012. With hosts Venezuela losing in the final, the fifth placed team was invited.

Central America and Caribbean
Some teams from the Central America and Caribbean Commission Zone had to qualify for the 2012 Centrobasket. The qualifying tournament was the 2011 FIBA CBC Championship for Caribbean teams. A FIBA COCABA Championship was supposedly held for teams from Mexico and Central America, but was no longer held; the supposed participants in that tournament automatically qualified to the 2012 Centrobasket.

South America
The 2012 South American Basketball Championship determined the teams that will qualify for 2013 FIBA Americas Championship. Since the USA is skipping this tournament, this opened up an additional berth for South American teams, increasing the number of berths from three to four, excluding Venezuela's berth as a host. This brings the number of South America's teams to five.

2011 FIBA CBC Championship
The 2011 FIBC CBC Championship in the Bahamas serves as the qualifier for the 2012 Centrobasket for Caribbean national teams. The top three advance to the Centrobasket.

Preliminary round

Group A

|}

Group B

|}

Classification round

Knockout round

Final ranking
This were the final rankings. The top 3 teams qualify for the 2012 Centrobasket.

2012 Centrobasket

Final ranking

Suspension of Panama
FIBA suspended the Panamanian Basketball Federation "for many problems that Panama has been going through for several years due to conflicts of interest between two Directives that manifest hold the same authority," as announced by FIBA Secretary-General Patrick Baumann. This means Panama's "national teams and clubs and referees, cannot participate in any international competition."

South American Basketball Championship 2012

Final ranking
This is the final ranking for the participating teams The top three teams excluding Venezuela qualify, but with the non-participation of the United States, the fourth-best team excluding Venezuela was also included.

References

Qual
FIBA AmeriCup qualification